Spencer Trevor (29 May 1875 – 22 May 1945) was a British stage and film actor.

He was born as Spencer Trevor Andrews. In 1897 he married the actress Mary Davis (1870–1944) and with her had a son, John Spencer Trevor Andrews (1897–1984); they divorced in 1901 as a result of her adultery with the actor J. Gunnis Davis.

Selected filmography
 Lucky Girl (1932)
 Congress Dances (1932)
 Two White Arms (1932)
 The Return of Bulldog Drummond (1934)
 Blossom Time (1934)
 Let the People Sing (1942)
 The Life and Death of Colonel Blimp (1943)

References

Bibliography
 Michelangelo Capua. Deborah Kerr: A Biography. McFarland, 2010.

External links

1875 births
1945 deaths
British male film actors
British male stage actors
People from Biarritz